Rateliff is a surname. Notable people with the surname include:

John D. Rateliff, American author of roleplaying games and independent scholar
Nathaniel Rateliff (born 1978), American singer and songwriter

See also
Ratliff

English-language surnames